The NWA World Tag Team Championship is a professional wrestling World Tag Team championship contested in various National Wrestling Alliance (NWA) affiliates. The NWA did not officially recognize any tag team champions until 1992 while various affiliates had previously had their own Tag Team championships.

Reigns

Combined reigns

Key

By team

By wrestler

See also
NWA World Tag Team Championship
National Wrestling Alliance (NWA)
Jim Crockett Promotions
Impact Wrestling

References

External links
Official NWA World Tag Team Title History
Wrestling-Titles.com - NWA World Tag Team Title History

National Wrestling Alliance championships
Professional wrestling tag team champion lists
Impact Wrestling champions lists